The list of college football yearly total offense leaders identifies the major college leaders for each season from 1937 to the present. It includes yearly leaders in two statistical categories: (1) total offense yards, and (2) total offense yards per game. From 1937 to 1969, the NCAA determined its national total offense individual title based on total yardage.  Starting in 1970, the NCAA began making that determination based on total offense yards per game.

Total offense leaders
Key
† = Winner of that year's Heisman Trophy
Bold = Figure established an NCAA major college record

Pre-1937 unofficial data 
Before 1937 the NCAA did not compile official statistics. This chart reflects unofficial total offense statistics compiled by historians mostly from newspaper accounts. Prior to 1913, total offense leaders will be almost exclusively due to rushing yards, and prior to 1906 there was no forward pass.

References

Total Offense